Liu Rongsheng is a Chinese cross-country skier who competes internationally.

He represented his country at the 2022 Winter Olympics.

References

External links

Chinese male cross-country skiers
2001 births
Living people
Olympic cross-country skiers of China
Cross-country skiers at the 2022 Winter Olympics
Sportspeople from Yunnan